Phoebe is a genus of evergreen trees and shrubs belonging to the Laurel family, Lauraceae. There are 75 accepted species in the genus, distributed in tropical and subtropical Asia and New Guinea. 35 species occur in China, of which 27 are endemic. The first description of the genus was of the type species P. lanceolata made in 1836 by Christian Gottfried Daniel Nees von Esenbeck in Systema Laurinarum, p. 98.

Description
Phoebe species are evergreen shrubs or trees with pinnately veined leaves. The flowers are hermaphrodite, white, small and fragrant, and are grouped in branched terminal inflorescences in the form of panicles. The bracts are all of equal length or the outer ones are slightly shorter than the inner ones. The ovary is oval to spherical. The stigma is capitate or bowl-shaped. The fruits are enveloped by the enlarged bracts. Fruits are usually oval to spherical. The fruit is a berry and has only a single seed that is frequently dispersed by birds.

Distribution
Up to 100 species of Phoebe are currently reported in Asia, with 27 species endemic to China.

Ecology
The fruits of the genus are fleshy berries.

Species
75 species are currently accepted:
Phoebe angustifolia Meisn. – Indochina, Assam, and China (southeastern Yunnan)
Phoebe assamica Kalyankumar – northeastern India
Phoebe attenuata (Nees) Nees – Eastern Himalayas, northeastern India, Bangladesh, Myanmar, and Vietnam
Phoebe baishyae M.Gangop. - Arunachal Pradesh in India
Phoebe birmanica Kosterm. – Myanmar
Phoebe bootanica (Meisn.) M.Gangop., synonym of Phoebe hainesiana – central and eastern Himalayas and northeastern India
Phoebe bournei (Hemsl.) Y.C.Yang - southern China and Hainan
Phoebe brachythyrsa H.W.Li – northeastern Yunnan in China
Phoebe calcarea S.Lee & F.N.Wei – Guangxi and southern Guizhou in China
Phoebe canescens (Blume) Miq. – Borneo, Peninsular Malaysia, and Sumatra
Phoebe cathia (D.Don) Kosterm. – southwestern and northeastern India, eastern Himalayas, Bangladesh, Myanmar, Laos, and Vietnam
Phoebe cavaleriei (H.Lév.) Y.Yang & Bing Liu – Sichuan, northeastern Yunnan, and Guizhou in China
Phoebe chartacea (Blume) Miq. – Java
Phoebe chekiangensis C.B.Shang – China (eastern Jiangxi, northern Fujian, and northern Zhejiang)
Phoebe clemensii C.K.Allen – New Guinea
Phoebe cooperiana P.C.Kanjilal & Das – northeastern India
Phoebe crassipedicella S.Lee & F.N.Wei – China (southern Guizhou and northwestern Guangxi)
Phoebe cuneata (Blume) Blume – Cambodia, Laos, Vietnam, Borneo, Sumatra, Java, Sulawesi
Phoebe cuspidata Blume – Java
Phoebe dehaasiifolia Kosterm. – Thailand
Phoebe elliptica Blume – Peninsular Malaysia, Java
Phoebe excelsa (Blume) Nees – Java
Phoebe faberi (Hemsl.) Chun – central China
Phoebe forbesii Gamble – New Guinea
Phoebe formosana (Hayata) Hayata – Taiwan and Anhui
Phoebe gamblei Kamik. – Java
Phoebe glabrifolia Merr. – Philippines
Phoebe glaucifolia S.K.Lee & F.N.Wei – southeastern Tibet and central Yunnan
Phoebe glaucophylla H.W.Li – southeastern Yunnan
Phoebe grandis (Nees) Merr. – Indochina, Peninsular Malaysia, Borneo, Sumatra, Java, and Sulawesi
Phoebe hainanensis Merr. – Hainan
Phoebe hedgei M.Gangop. & A.Sarmah – Arunachal Pradesh
Phoebe hekouensis Bing Liu, W.Y.Jin, L.N.Zhao & Y.Yang – Yunnan
Phoebe holosericea Blume – Sumatra
Phoebe hui W.C.Cheng ex Y.C.Yang – China (Sichuan, northeastern Yunnan, and southern Shaanxi)
Phoebe hunanensis Hand.-Mazz. – central and southern China
Phoebe hungmaoensis  S.K.Lee – China (Hainan and southwestern and southern Guangxi), Vietnam
Phoebe javanica Meisn. – Java
Phoebe kjellbergii Kosterm. – Sulawesi
Phoebe kunstleri Gamble – Vietnam, Laos, Borneo
Phoebe kwangsiensis H.Liu – China (southwestern Guizhou and northwestern Guangxi)
Phoebe laevis Kosterm. – Borneo
Phoebe lanceolata (Nees) Nees – India, Bangladesh, eastern Himalaya, Indochina, Peninsular Malaysia, China (southern Yunnan)
Phoebe legendrei Lecomte – China (western and southeastern Sichuan and northwestern Yunnan)
Phoebe leiophylla Miq. – Borneo and Sulawesi
Phoebe liana Y.Yang – China (Guizhou)
Phoebe lichuanensis  S.K.Lee – China (southwestern Hubei)
Phoebe longepetiolata Kosterm. – Sumatra
Phoebe lucida Blume – Sumatra and Borneo
Phoebe lummaoensis M.Gangop. – Myanmar
Phoebe macrocarpa C.Y.Wu, synonym of Phoebe poilanei – China (southeastern Yunnan) and northern Vietnam
Phoebe macrophylla Blume – Vietnam, Borneo, Sumatra, Java, Maluku, New Guinea
Phoebe megacalyx H.W.Li – China (southeastern Yunnan) to northern Vietnam
Phoebe motuonan S.K.Lee & F.N.Wei – southeastern Tibet
Phoebe neurantha (Hemsl.) Gamble – central and southern China
Phoebe neuranthoides S.K.Lee & F.N.Wei – central and southern China
Phoebe nigrifolia S.K.Lee & F.N.Wei – China (southwestern Guangxi)
Phoebe obtusa Blume ex Meisn. – Java
Phoebe pallida (Nees) Nees – western and central Himalaya, Northeastern India, Bangladesh, Myanmar, Vietnam
Phoebe petelotii Kosterm. ex H.H.Pham – Vietnam
Phoebe pierrei Lecomte – Cambodia
Phoebe prazeri M.Gangop. – Myanmar
Phoebe puwenensis W.C.Cheng – China (southern Yunnan)
Phoebe rufescens H.W.Li – China (southwestern Yunnan)
Phoebe scortechinii (Gamble) Kochummen ex de Kok – Peninsular Malaysia
Phoebe sheareri (Hemsl.) Gamble – southern China and Vietnam
Phoebe siamensis Kosterm. – Thailand
Phoebe sterculioides (Elmer) Merr. – Philippines
Phoebe tavoyana Hook.f. –  China (Yunnan, southeastern Guangxi, and Guangdong), Indochina, and Peninsular Malaysia
Phoebe tenuifolia Kosterm. – Philippines and Sulawesi
Phoebe wightii Meisn. – southwestern India
Phoebe yaiensis S.K.Lee – China (southwestern Guangxi and Hainan) and Vietnam
Phoebe yunnanensis H.W.Li – China (western Yunnan)
Phoebe zhennan S.K.Lee & F.N.Wei – China (Sichuan, western Hubei, and northwestern Guizhou)

Formerly placed here
Phoebe nanmu (Oliver) Gamble, synonym of Machilus nanmu

Phylogeny 
After

Fossil record
Several fossil cupules, some with fruits inside of †Phoebe bohemica from the early Miocene, have been found at the Kristina Mine at Hrádek nad Nisou in North Bohemia, the Czech Republic.

References

External links
 UNEP-WCMC Species Database - Phoebe

 
Lauraceae genera
Indomalayan realm flora